Bonitzer is a surname. Notable people with the surname include:
 Agathe Bonitzer (born 1989), French actress
 Pascal Bonitzer (born 1946), French screenwriter, film director and actor